Felice Tedeschi is an Italian racing driver currently competing in the Italian GT Championship. He is a former World Touring Car Championship driver, who made his debut in 2012.

Racing career
Tedeschi began his career in 1982 in Formula Fiat Abarth. He also raced in the Italian Formula 3 for several seasons, finishing 7th in the standings in 1988. He raced in the Italian Superturismo Championship from 1994-1997 before switching to the International Sports Racing Series. In 1998, he continued to race in the series up until 2000. 
He didn't race much after this, but did make one-off appearances in the Porsche Supercup in 2003 and in the Superstars Series in 2011. In September 2012, it was announced that Tedeschi would make his World Touring Car Championship debut with Proteam Racing driving a BMW 320 TC in the Race of the United States round held at Sonoma Raceway. However he had an accident in the first practice session, leaving his car to badly damaged, to be repaired in time for the races. In 2015, he went back to rack in GT Italian Tourismo Championship, driving a Ferrari 458. He participated in 6 race, earning the podium distinction in his category.

Racing record

Complete World Touring Car Championship results
(key) (Races in bold indicate pole position – 1 point awarded just in first race; races in italics indicate fastest lap – 1 point awarded all races; * signifies that driver led race for at least one lap – 1 point given all races)

References

External links
 

Living people
World Touring Car Championship drivers
Italian racing drivers
Year of birth missing (living people)